Hiroyuki Konishi ( Konishi Hiroyuki; 19 October 1936 – 23 January 2022) was a Japanese politician.

A member of the Democratic Socialist Party, he served in the House of Councillors from 1980 to 1992. He died in Kure on 23 January 2022, at the age of 85.

References

1936 births
2022 deaths
20th-century Japanese politicians
Democratic Socialist Party (Japan) politicians
Kochi University alumni
Members of the House of Councillors (Japan)
Politicians from Kagawa Prefecture